Wollaston may refer to:

Places

Antarctica 
 Cape Wollaston, Palmer Archipelago

Australia 
 John Wollaston Anglican Community School, private school in Kelmscott, Perth, Western Australia
 Wollaston, Western Australia, suburb of Bunbury, Western Australia
 Wollaston Island (Western Australia), off the coast of Kimberley

Canada 
 Wollaston, Ontario, a township
 Wollaston Islands (Nunavut)
 Wollaston Peninsula, split between Northwest Territories and Nunavut, Canada
 Wollaston Lake, lake in north-eastern Saskatchewan
 Wollaston Lake Airport
 Wollaston Lake, Saskatchewan, a village

Chile 
 Wollaston Islands, group of islands near Cape Horn

England 
 Wollaston, Northamptonshire
 Wollaston School
 Wollaston, Shropshire
 Wollaston, West Midlands

Greenland 
 Wollaston Foreland, peninsula in Northeast Greenland

United States 
 Wollaston (Quincy, Massachusetts), neighborhood in Quincy, Massachusetts
 Wollaston (MBTA station), MBTA station
 Wollaston Beach, public beach
 Wollaston Theatre, historic building
 Mount Wollaston, various locations in Quincy, Massachusetts

Moon 
 Wollaston (crater), lunar crater

People
 Arthur Wollaston (1865–1933), English footballer, played for Aston Villa
 Sir Arthur Naylor Wollaston KCIE  (1842–1922), Superintendent of Records, India Office
 Belinda Wollaston (born 1983), Australian musical theatre actor
 Charles Wollaston (1849–1926), English footballer, played for Wanderers and England
 Charlton Wollaston (1733–1764), English physician
 Charlton James Wollaston, English, of Wollaston et Compagnie, building the first international submarine telegraph cable (Dover-Calais) in 1851 with engineer Thomas Russell Crampton

 Francis Wollaston (scientist) (1694–1774)
 Francis Wollaston (astronomer) (1731–1815)
 Francis Wollaston (philosopher) (1762–1823)
 George Wollaston (1738–1826), Fellow of the Royal Society
 Gerald Wollaston (1874–1957), officer of arms at the College of Arms in London
 Sir Harry Wollaston (1846–1921), Australian public servant
 James Wollaston (1873–1918), English footballer, played for Small Heath
 John Wollaston (clergyman) (1791–1856), Anglican clergyman in Western Australia
 John Wollaston (painter), English-born American portraitist
 Richard Wollaston, English sea captain and pirate 
 Sandy Wollaston (1875–1930), British explorer
 Dr Sarah Wollaston (born 1962), British general practitioner and MP for Totnes (2010–2019)
 Thomas Vernon Wollaston (1822–1878), English entomologist and malacologist
 Tullie Cornthwaite Wollaston, opal dealer credited with introducing the claret ash to Australia at Raywood, Aldgate, SA
 William Wollaston (1659–1724), English philosophical writer
 William Wollaston (Ipswich MP elected 1733) (1693–1764)
 William Wollaston (Ipswich MP elected 1768) (1730–1797)
 William Hyde Wollaston (1766–1828), English chemist, physicist and Fellow of the Royal Society

Other
 Wollaston Medal, awarded for work in geology
 Wollaston prism, optical device, invented by William Hyde Wollaston
 Wollaston's roundleaf bat, species of bat in the family Hipposideridae

See also
 Woolaston, a village in Gloucestershire
 Woollaston (disambiguation)
 Wollaston family tree